John McNally may refer to:

Sports 
 John McNally (boxer) (1932–2022), Irish Olympic boxer
 John McNally (sport shooter) (born 1956), American Olympic sport shooter
 John McNally (tennis) (born 1998), American tennis player

Other 
 John McNally (musician) (born 1941), singer and guitarist with the Searchers
 John McNally (politician) (born 1951), Scottish National Party politician, MP for Falkirk since 2015
 John McNally IV (born 1969), mayor of Youngstown, Ohio
 John McNally (Emmerdale), a fictional character on the British soap opera Emmerdale

See also 
 Johnny "Blood" McNally (John Victor McNally, 1903–1985), American football player and coach